Krzeszów  (Kreshiv) is a village in Nisko County, Subcarpathian Voivodeship, in south-eastern Poland. It is the seat of the gmina (administrative district) called Gmina Krzeszów.

In 2005 the village had a population of 862.

During the Holocaust, the 250 to 500 Jews in the village were murdered.

References

External links
 Official website of Krzeszów

Villages in Nisko County
Kholm Governorate